The Second Affiliated Hospital of Xinjiang Medical University is a teaching hospital in Urumqi, Xinjiang, China affiliated with Xinjiang Medical University.

History
On October 25, 1954 the Xinjiang Military District issued a letter for the establishment of the Xinjiang Production and Construction Corps, the First Military Hospital. In June 1954, the Ministry of Health and the Northwest Field Army Corps preparing to come to the proposed sites in the field for investigation, preparation of construction plans. In August 1954, construction of the hospital began.

Composition
Hospital is divided into two parts;
 7-Bay Hospital (old house)
 South Lake Hospital (new house)
It has a total of 1041 beds, 47 medical and clinical departments, clinical teaching and research section. Hospital has a professionally trained staff including 102 professional and technical staff, more than 70 master's degree doctors, more than 250 mid-level professionals and technicians. It is  a level-A rated hospital in Xinjiang treating bone and joint diseases and peripheral nerve diseases. Xinjiang deaf and dumb rehabilitation, prevention and treatment center is also a major project of this hospital.

Treatment facilities
Hospital has:
 Two-Philips 1.5T gradient nuclear magnetic resonance imaging instrument (MRI)
 16-slice CT machine
 Two-board digital movie system (DR)
 Siemens DSA 1000 mA System
 GE digital gastrointestinal X-ray machines
 High-grade abdominal radiology machines
 Cardiac-specific color Doppler ultrasound diagnostic apparatus
 OLYMPUS2700 automatic biochemical analyzer
and other biochemical analyzer equipment. With various minimally invasive surgery and endoscopic surgical microscopes and advanced cardiac surgery  equipment and operating room.

Achievements 
The hospital has received more than 50 scientific and technological awards, 32 medical professionals have published more than 1,000 research articles in the Chinese Journal of Medicine.

References

 

Xinjiang Medical University
Hospital buildings completed in 1954
Hospital XMU 2
Hospitals in Xinjiang
Teaching hospitals in China
Hospitals established in 1954
1954 establishments in China